Kalyan Banerjee is an Indian homoeopath from New Delhi. An alumnus of the Mihijan Institute of Homeopathy, he founded the Dr. Kalyan Banerjee Clinic, a homoeopathic healthcare centre based in Chittaranjan Park, New Delhi, in 1977. He has been associated with several government agencies such as the Central Council for Research in Homoeopathy at the Ministry of Health and Family Welfare and was formerly a member of its Governing Council, and the Central Council for Research in Homoeopathy (CCRH) of the Ministry of AYUSH, with a seat in the Homeopathic Pharmacopoeia Committee and the Standing Finance Committee. In 2009, the Government of India awarded him the Padma Shri, the fourth highest civilian honour, for his work in the field of medicine.

References 

Recipients of the Padma Shri in medicine
Year of birth missing (living people)
People from New Delhi
Indian homeopaths
Living people
Medical doctors from Delhi
20th-century Indian medical doctors